The West of Scotland Coronary Prevention Study, also known as WOSCOPS, was a  randomized, double-blind, placebo-controlled clinical trial, published in 1995. It compared 40mg of the lipid-lowering drug pravastatin to placebo in 6, 595 men who had a mean cholesterol of 7 mmol/L but no previous history of a heart attack. The study concluded that statin treatment for primary prevention reduced coronary heart disease (CHD) events by 31% after nearly five years of treatment.

See also
 Heart Protection Study
 Scandinavian Simvastatin Survival Study

References

Epidemiological study projects
Clinical trials related to cardiology
Statins
Cardiology